The 1944 Indiana gubernatorial election was held on November 7, 1944. Republican nominee Ralph F. Gates narrowly defeated Democratic nominee Samuel D. Jackson with 50.97% of the vote.

General election

Candidates
Major party candidates
Ralph F. Gates, Republican, Chairman of the Indiana Republican Party and town attorney of South Whitley
Samuel D. Jackson, Democratic, former Indiana Attorney General (1940 – 1941)

Other candidates
Waldo E. Yeater, Prohibition
William Rabe, Socialist

Results

References

1944
Indiana
Gubernatorial